FP7 may refer to:
 Seventh Framework Programme, European Union research and development funding programme
 EMD FP7, a General Motors diesel locomotive